Cephalanthus is a genus of flowering plants in the family Rubiaceae. There are about six species that are commonly known as buttonbush.

Description
The leaves are simple, arranged in opposite pairs or whorls of three. The flowers form a dense globular inflorescence.

Distribution and habitat
Cephalanthus occidentalis is native to the eastern United States and Canada. The others occur in tropical regions of the Americas, Africa and Asia. Two species are known in cultivation.

Systematics
Cephalanthus was named by Linnaeus in Species Plantarum in 1753. The generic name is derived from the Ancient Greek words κέφαλη (kephale), meaning "head", and ἄνθος (anthos), meaning "flower".

Taxonomy
Cephalanthus is the most basal genus in the tribe Naucleeae. Some authors have segregated it into its own monotypic tribe. The type species is Cephalanthus occidentalis.

Species
Cephalanthus angustifolius Lour. - Laos, Cambodia, Vietnam
Cephalanthus glabratus (Spreng.) K.Schum. - sarandí - Brazil, Argentina, Paraguay, Uruguay
Cephalanthus natalensis Oliv. - Tanzania, Malawi, Zambia, Lesotho, Eswatini, South Africa
Cephalanthus occidentalis L. - button-willow, common buttonbush, honey-bells - Cuba, eastern Canada, eastern, central and southern United States, California, Arizona, New Mexico
Cephalanthus salicifolius  Humb. & Bonpl. - Mexican buttonbush, willowleaf buttonbush - Mexico, Honduras, extreme southern tip of Texas
Cephalanthus tetrandra (Roxb.) Ridsdale & Bakh.f. - tropical Asia from India to China and Thailand

Fossil record
16 fossil mericarps of †Chephalanthus pusillus have been described from middle Miocene strata of the Fasterholt area near Silkeborg in Central Jutland, Denmark.

References

External links

Kew World Checklist of Selected Plant Families, Cephalanthus
USDA PLANTS, Cephalanthus
Flora of Taiwan, Cephalanthus

 
Rubiaceae genera
Taxa named by Carl Linnaeus